In topology, a sub-Stonean space is a locally compact Hausdorff space such that any two open σ-compact disjoint subsets have disjoint compact closures. When dealing with compact spaces, the two concepts are the same, but in general, the concepts are different. The relationship between the sub-Stonean spaces and F-spaces is studied in Henriksen and Woods, 1989.

Examples
Rickart spaces and the corona sets of locally compact σ-compact Hausdorff spaces are sub-Stonean spaces.

See also
 Extremally disconnected space
 F-space

References

Properties of topological spaces